George Joseph (born September 11, 1921) is an American billionaire businessman who is the founder of general-line insurance firm Mercury General Corporation of Los Angeles.

Early life and education
Joseph was born in Beckley, West Virginia, in 1921, the son of Lebanese immigrants. His father worked as a coal miner and storekeeper. He served in the United States Air Force as a B-17 navigator in World War II, serving in some 50 missions.  In 1949, he earned a degree in Physics and Mathematics from Harvard University in 3 years on the GI Bill.

Career
After he graduated, he took a job with the Occidental Life Insurance Company in Los Angeles as a systems analyst. In the evenings, he sold life insurance door-to-door. Noting that many of his customers would inquire about other lines of insurance (auto, property), Joseph proposed for Occidental to expand its offerings. After being rebuffed in 1954, he left Occidental and started his own insurance agency in California that bundled the life insurance policies he was already selling with property and casualty insurance and automobile insurance policies.

At the time, the automobile insurance industry was not flexible, with all drivers paying the same rate, regardless of their driving record or experience. Noting that, Joseph founded Mercury Insurance in 1962. Mercury offered auto insurance policies with differing rates, based on a driver's record and experience, a first in the industry. As of 2013, Mercury employs 4,000 agents and has $4 billion in assets.

Joseph remains actively involved in the operations of Mercury Insurance as the chairman of the board, but the CEO of the company is now Gabe Tirador.

Political activities
Joseph was active in the opposition to California Proposition 103 which regulated providers of insurance to individuals in California.  Proposition 103 requires insurance carriers to file rates and receive prior approval before using the rates, and required all insurance carriers to roll back rates 20%. Joseph fought to repeal parts of the law in 1993, based on the grounds that the law promoted increased litigation in the insurance industry and that the law restricted competitive actions by insurance carriers.

Personal life
Joseph is listed in the 2017 Forbes richest men in the world list, with an estimated net worth of US$1.6 billion.

References

External links
History of Mercury
George Joseph, The World's Richest People
 Biography

Living people
1921 births
Harvard University alumni
American people of Lebanese descent
Businesspeople from West Virginia
United States Army Air Forces personnel of World War II
Military personnel from West Virginia
American businesspeople in insurance
American billionaires
American centenarians
Men centenarians
United States Army Air Forces officers